Pakkanen is a Finnish surname. Notable people with the surname include:

 Atte Pakkanen (1912–1994), Finnish politician
 Erkki Pakkanen (1930–1973), amateur lightweight boxer from Finland
 Santeri Pakkanen (born 1998), Finnish professional footballer

Finnish-language surnames